Lafayette station is a train station in Lafayette, Louisiana, United States. It is served by the Sunset Limited, operated by Amtrak, the national railroad passenger system.

The Lafayette station was originally built by the Texas and New Orleans Railroad in either 1911 or 1912, but burned in a fire and was abandoned on May 11, 2001. Completed in 2007, the $11 million restoration of the station was funded through the city government, Federal Transit Administration and the Louisiana Department of Transportation and Development, and included work on the exterior walls and platform canopy. The depot now houses a city transit office, waiting room for bus and Amtrak passengers and the office for the city-parish Traffic and Transportation Department.

References

External links

Lafayette Amtrak Station (USA Rail Guide -- Train Web)

Amtrak stations in Louisiana
Former Southern Pacific Railroad stations